Miami Creek is a stream in Bates County, Missouri. It is a tributary of the Marais des Cygnes River.

The source area for the stream lies in the northwest corner of Bates County southeast of Drexel. the stream flows southeast passing under Missouri Route 18 north and east of Merwin. It continues southeast passing southwest of Butler and under U.S. Route 71. It enters the Marais des Cygnes River just north of Missouri Route B about four miles east of Rich Hill.

Miami Creek has the name of the Miami Native American nation.

See also
List of rivers of Missouri

References

Rivers of Bates County, Missouri
Rivers of Missouri